Gnophomyia is a genus of crane fly in the family Limoniidae.

Species

G. adjusta Alexander, 1949
G. anaphora Alexander, 1954
G. angusticellula Alexander, 1980
G. apicularis Alexander, 1945
G. arcuata Alexander, 1914
G. argutula Alexander, 1944
G. astuta Alexander, 1965
G. axillaris Alexander, 1921
G. banksiana Alexander, 1945
G. bipectinata Alexander, 1965
G. brevicellula Alexander, 1923
G. bulbibasis Alexander, 1944
G. caloptera Osten Sacken, 1888
G. certa Alexander, 1952
G. chilota Alexander, 1929
G. cockerelli Alexander, 1919
G. coxitalis Alexander, 1944
G. cryptolabina Edwards, 1932
G. ctenura Savchenko, 1976
G. dejecta Alexander, 1929
G. delectabilis Alexander, 1965
G. diacaena Alexander, 1967
G. diacantha Alexander, 1967
G. diazi Alexander, 1937
G. dictena Alexander, 1942
G. digitiformis Alexander, 1941
G. distifurcula Alexander, 1943
G. duplex Alexander, 1937
G. elsneri Stary, 1983
G. emarginata Alexander, 1945
G. eupetes Alexander, 1963
G. ferruginea Williston, 1900
G. fessa Alexander, 1944
G. filiformis Alexander, 1930
G. flaviclava Edwards, 1933
G. flebilis Alexander, 1944
G. fraterna Edwards, 1916
G. fraternoides Alexander, 1927
G. fuscocostalis Alexander, 1947
G. glabritergata Alexander, 1965
G. jacobsoni Alexander, 1927
G. justa Alexander, 1938
G. justoides Alexander, 1938
G. kertesziana Alexander, 1930
G. klossiana Alexander, 1942
G. lachrymosa Alexander, 1919
G. lata Alexander, 1943
G. laticincta Alexander, 1919
G. latilobata Alexander, 1949
G. latissima Alexander, 1967
G. longicellula Edwards, 1927
G. longiterebra Alexander, 1943
G. longitergata Alexander, 1943
G. lugubris (Zetterstedt, 1838)
G. macrocera Alexander, 1930
G. maculipleura Edwards, 1916
G. maestitia Alexander, 1914
G. magica Alexander, 1945
G. magniarcuata Alexander, 1949
G. mediotuberculata Alexander, 1949
G. molinae Alexander, 1930
G. monophaea Alexander, 1946
G. multiermis Alexander, 1956
G. nahuelbutae Alexander, 1967
G. nebulicincta Alexander, 1954
G. nectarea Alexander, 1944
G. neofraterna Alexander, 1950
G. nigrescens Edwards, 1916
G. nigrina (Wiedemann, 1828)
G. nimbifera Alexander, 1943
G. nitens Edwards, 1933
G. nycteris Alexander, 1924
G. obesula Alexander, 1931
G. orientalis de Meijere, 1911
G. ostensackeni Skuse, 1890
G. oxymera Alexander, 1943
G. pallidapex Alexander, 1929
G. pauciseta Alexander, 1949
G. peracutior Alexander, 1949
G. perdebilis Alexander, 1949
G. perlata Alexander, 1944
G. permagica Alexander, 1947
G. persevera Alexander, 1949
G. petentis Alexander, 1949
G. platystyla Alexander, 1979
G. podacantha Alexander, 1944
G. porteri Alexander, 1930
G. propatula Alexander, 1947
G. pulvinaris Alexander, 1945
G. quartaria (Brunetti, 1913)
G. regnatrix Alexander, 1943
G. rubicundula Alexander, 1921
G. sagitta Alexander, 1949
G. sagittoides Alexander, 1951
G. similis Edwards, 1916
G. socialis Alexander, 1949
G. spinibasis Alexander, 1943
G. stenochorema Alexander, 1962
G. stenophallus Alexander, 1941
G. stupens (Walker, 1861)
G. stylacuta Alexander, 1947
G. subapicularis Alexander, 1945
G. subarcuata Alexander, 1946
G. subflebilis Alexander, 1949
G. subhyalina Alexander, 1913
G. subnimbifera Alexander, 1967
G. subobliterata Alexander, 1946
G. suffusibasis Alexander, 1980
G. teleneura Alexander, 1944
G. tetracaena Alexander, 1967
G. tiresias Alexander, 1949
G. toleranda Alexander, 1955
G. toschiae Alexander, 1966
G. transversa Alexander, 1949
G. triatrata Alexander, 1968
G. tricepoides Alexander, 1967
G. triceps Alexander, 1947
G. tricornis Alexander, 1949
G. trilobata Alexander, 1980
G. trisetigera Alexander, 1949
G. tristissima Osten Sacken, 1860
G. tuber Alexander, 1944
G. tungurahuana Alexander, 1946
G. vanitas Alexander, 1950
G. vilis Alexander, 1931
G. viridipennis (Gimmerthal, 1847)
G. vitripennis Alexander, 1942

References

Limoniidae
Nematocera genera